refers to a number of aircraft that were operated by Japanese airline All Nippon Airways in a promotional Pokémon livery. The exteriors of the aircraft were painted with pictures of various Pokémon and the interiors were decorated with a Pokémon theme. Though the use of these liveries by ANA ended in 2016, as of 2021, the scheme has been revived, this time with Solaseed Air, Air Do, and Skymark Airlines, in 2022, Scoot becomes the first non-Japanese airline to introduce a Pokémon Jet, followed by China Airlines and T'way Air later that year.

History
After the appearance of Pokémon in 1996, and the resultant Pokémon-related craze, All Nippon Airways unveiled the first Pokémon Jets on 1 July 1998, timed with the release of Pokémon: The First Movie. The first two to be unveiled were a Boeing 747-400D (JA8965) and a Boeing 767-300 (JA8569), and each displayed a number of the then 151 Pokémon characters, including Pikachu. Due to the popularity of the aircraft, a second 767 was unveiled a matter of weeks later. The three aircraft were introduced on numerous domestic flights in Japan. A fourth aircraft, a Boeing 747-400, was painted in a Pokémon livery in February 1999, and was called the US version by the airline, as it was put into service on the airline's North American network. The aircraft was identical to the previous three aircraft, except the letters ANA were kept on the vertical stabiliser, and operated its first flight to New York City's JFK International Airport on 24 February 1999.

All Nippon Airways announced in March 1999 that a fifth aircraft would be painted in a Pokémon scheme, and a contest was held which saw children between the ages of six and twelve submitting entries. The announcement was timed to coincide with the release of Pokémon: The Movie 2000 in Japan in the summer of 1999. The winning design was rolled out at Osaka on 20 June 1999 on a Boeing 747-400D (JA8964), with the same design appearing shortly thereafter on two Boeing 767-300s (JA8288 and JA8357).

In 2011, a Boeing 777-300 (JA754A) was painted in a Pokémon livery featuring characters from the Pokémon Black and White video games. All Nippon Airways had originally intended to allow children to vote on the livery design for this Pokémon Jet, but the voting event was cancelled as a result of the 2011 Tōhoku earthquake and tsunami. The aircraft has been dubbed the Peace Jet, as the selected livery design is intended to express the wish for a world filled with peace. This Pokémon Jet was placed into service on the airline's domestic network on 18 July 2011, just two days after Victini and the Black Hero: Zekrom and Victini and the White Hero: Reshiram were released at movie theaters in Japan.

On 8 October 2013, JA8956 and JA8957 simultaneously retired as the part of the airline's plan to retire all Boeing 747s, leaving JA754A the only Pokémon Jet in service.

On 14 April 2016, the Pokémon theming of JA754A was removed and repainted into a standard ANA livery, leaving no Pokémon jets in operation.

On 19 December 2020, Solaseed Air inaugurated a Boeing 737-800 (JA812X) with an Exeggutor livery, making it the first Boeing plane to feature a single species of Pokémon, rather than an ensemble. Solaseed Air is headquartered at the Miyazaki Airport in the city of Miyazaki, Miyazaki Prefecture, Japan; which made Exeggutor its official "Support Pokémon" in October 2020.

On 21 June 2021, Skymark Airlines inaugurated a Boeing 737-800 (JA73AB) with a Pikachu livery, the livery called the “Flying Pikachu Project,” Skymark Airlines wants to use Pikachu to help promote tourism in the Okinawa Prefecture. When passengers come aboard this aircraft, aside from having Pokémon-themed seats and cabin crew, they are greeted by the Pokémon Center theme from Pokémon Sword and Shield. On this aircraft, there are also Pokémon-themed cups (and amenities) and special limited edition KitKats as part of the in-flight refreshment service, and even the self check-in kiosks for the Pikachu route are decked out in Pikachu colours. For a limited time, Japanese Pokémon Go players could find a special Pikachu wearing a Kariyushi shirt at airports on the route the aircraft serves.

On 19 November 2021, Air Do inaugurated a Boeing 767-300 (JA607A) with a Vulpix livery, the livery is called "Rokon Jet", the airline is currently using the special livery for 5 years and started services with the special livery in December 2021. The special livery consists of both forms of Vulpix on both sides: on the port side is the Alolan Vulpix, while the starboard side features the Kantonian Vulpix.

On 30 May 2022, Skymark Airlines introduced a second Pokémon Jet (JA73NG) called "Pikachu Jet BC2", It will operate on routes between Okinawa, Naha, and Simojishima, and will stay in service with this special livery for five years.

On 17 July 2022, Scoot introduced a Boeing 787-9 (9V-OJJ) painted in a Pokémon livery, becoming the first non-Japanese airline to introduce a Pokémon Jet. 

On 30 September 2022, China Airlines had introduced an Airbus A321neo (B-18101) painted a Pokémon livery called "Pikachu Jet CI", becoming the second non-Japanese airline to introduce a Pokémon Jet. It will operated flights to various Japanese cities from its base at Taiwan.

On 28 December 2022, T'way Air had introduced a Boeing 737-800 (HL8306) in a Pokémon livery called "Pikachu Jet TW", thus becoming the third non-Japanese airline to introduce a Pokemon Jet. The aircraft will operate flights to Japan and Taiwan from its base at South Korea.

Passenger experience and response
Passengers on the Pokémon Jets received a complete Pokémon experience. The aircraft and flight crews were decked out in Pokémon themes, including headrests, flight attendant uniforms, food containers, inflight entertainment, and souvenir bags. All Nippon Airways reported that it experienced an increase in the number of passengers carried as a result of operating the Pokémon Jets.

List of Pokémon Jets

References

External links
 All Nippon Airways Pokémon Jet website
 All Nippon Airways Pokémon Jet website 
 Pokémon Air Adventures website

All Nippon Airways
China Airlines
Jet
Aircraft liveries